Logan February (born 1999) is a Nigerian poet, essayist, music reviewer, singer, songwriter, and LGBTQ activist.

Biography 

Logan February was born in Anambra state of Nigeria on 23 April 1999, and grew up in Ibadan. Logan studied psychology at the University of Ibadan. They are non-binary and use they/them pronouns.

Works 
Logan is the author of In the Nude, published in Nigeria by Ouida Poetry, 2019, and as Mannequin in the Nude by PANK Books in the USA. They are also the author of the chapbooks Painted Blue with Saltwater (Indolent Books, 2018). How to Cook a Ghost (Glass Poetry Press, 2017). Logan is a Pushcart and Best of the Net nominee and their poetry collection, Mannequin in the Nude was a finalist for in the 2018 African Poetry Book Fund and was also listed in one of the top fifteen debut book in Nigeria by Brittle Paper.

Logan reviews music for online magazines. In 2017 they were featured on Eri Ife's THE EP. The introduction of THE EP was a poetry performance by Logan and in the track Nobody, Logan sang alongside Eri Ife. Logan released two singles titled Black SUV and Games in 2020.

As an LGBTQ activist in Nigeria, Logan was a guest editor for the "There Is Hope" series during the 2020 Pride month for Ynaija's nonbinary blog.

Bibliography 
Books
 How to Cook a Ghost (2017)
 Painted Blue with Saltwater (2018)
 In the Nude (2019)

Anthologies and magazines
 Un_Masking Difference. Literary Voices from Behind the Mask, edited by Natasha A. Kelly (2020)
  Berlin Quarterly, THE THIRTEENTH ISSUE, Winter 2021

Honors and awards 
 2020 — Web Residency at Literarisches Colloquium Berlin
 2021 — Winner of The Future Awards Africa

References 

1999 births
Living people
21st-century Nigerian poets
Nigerian editors
University of Ibadan alumni
Queer literature
Writers from Ibadan
Nigerian non-binary people
Non-binary writers
Non-binary musicians
Non-binary activists